Jessica Cerra (born May 1, 1982) is an American professional racing cyclist, who currently rides for UCI Women's Team .

Major results
2018
 Redlands Bicycle Classic
1st  Mountains classification
1st Stage 4

See also
 List of 2016 UCI Women's Teams and riders

References

External links
 

1982 births
Living people
American female cyclists
Place of birth missing (living people)
21st-century American women